Alberto Barbieri is an Argentine academic, former rector of the University of Buenos Aires.

References

External links
 http://www.infobae.com/2013/12/05/1528660-quien-es-alberto-barbieri-el-nuevo-rector-la-uba

Rectors of the University of Buenos Aires
Living people
Year of birth missing (living people)
Place of birth missing (living people)